Elly Elizabeth Donald (born 17 September 1997) is an Australian cricketer who played for Victoria in the Women's National Cricket League (WNCL). An all-rounder, she bats right-handed and bowls right-arm medium pace. She made her WNCL debut on 9 November 2018, scoring 26 runs in a 48-run loss to the ACT Meteors. She was part of the Melbourne Stars squad for the 2018–19 Women's Big Bash League season but did not make an appearance.

Donald currently studies a Bachelor of Exercise and Sport Science at Deakin University.

References

External links

Elly Donald at Cricket Australia

1997 births
Living people
Cricketers from Victoria (Australia)
Sportswomen from Victoria (Australia)
Australian women cricketers
Melbourne Stars (WBBL) cricketers
Victoria women cricketers